Angelo Messedaglia was an Italian social scientist, statistician and politician.

Biography
Born in Villafranca (Verona) on November 2, 1820, he graduated from University of Pavia with a degree in law in 1843. In 1848 he  became the provisional government of Milan and was appointed as professor of commercial law the same year. He taught economics and statistics at the universities of Padua and Rome and written many public works on population theory, statistics, analysis, monetary and land. His learning led him to also perform studies on hydraulics and geology and engage both in prose and in poetry. He contributed to several magazines including New Anthology and was a Member of Parliament for Verona from 1866 to 1883 of which he became a senator on May 10, 1884. He died in Rome April 5, 1901.

Publications
Statistica morale dell'Inghilterra comparata alla statistica morale della Francia di M.A. Guerry (1865);
L'imperatore Diocleziano e la legge economica del mercato (1866);
La statistica e i suoi metodi (1872);
L'insegnamento politico-amministrativo (1880);
L'economia politica (1891).

References

1820 births
1901 deaths
19th-century Italian politicians
Italian statisticians
Italian social scientists
University of Pavia alumni
Academic staff of the University of Padua
Academic staff of the Sapienza University of Rome